Margo Humphrey (born June 25, 1942) is an American printmaker, illustrator and art teacher. She earned a Master of Fine Arts degree from Stanford after earning a Bachelor of Fine Arts degree at the California College of Arts and Crafts in printmaking. She has traveled in Africa, Brazil, the Caribbean, and Europe and has taught in Fiji, Nigeria, Uganda, and the University of Maryland. As a printmaker, she is known for her "bold, expressive use of color and freedom of form", creating works that are "engaging, exuberant and alive." Her techniques for layering colors are uncommon in lithography. Her work is considered to be "in the forefront of contemporary printmaking."

Career

She was born in Oakland, California on June 25, 1942.  She attended the Oakland Public Schools and graduated in 1960 from Oakland High School as an art major. After earning her BFA in Painting and Printmaking from the California College of Arts and Crafts, she attended Stanford University Graduate School earning a Masters of Fine Arts degree with Honors in Printmaking in 1974.

She began teaching in 1973 at the University of California Santa Cruz and has since taught at the University of Texas at San Antonio, the San Francisco Art Institute, and School of the Art Institute of Chicago.  She has also taught at the University of the South Pacific at Suva, Fiji; Yaba Technological Institute of Fine Art, Ekoi Island, Nigeria; the University of Benin in Benin City, Nigeria;  the Margaret Trowell School of Fine Art in Kampala, Uganda, and the Fine Art School of the National Gallery of Art, Harare, Zimbabwe.  She is currently the Department Head of Printmaking the University of Maryland in College Park.

Humphrey has worked in media such as lithography, monoprint, woodcut, etching and drawing.  She is particularly respected for her work in lithography, a field which is highly technical and traditionally seen as male dominated. Many of her works are informed by the feminist art movement of the 1970s.  Humphrey has worked with significant printmaking ateliers including the Rutgers Center for Innovative Print and Paper, the Bob Blackburn Printmaking Workshop and the Tamarind Institute in New Mexico.  She was one of the earliest African-American woman artists to be recognized for lithographic works and the first to have her prints published by Tamarind, in 1974.

Her lithographs tell personal stories using a figurative style that combines autobiography with fantasy. Through a personal iconography of everyday objects, she illuminates her experiences as an African American woman.  She developed her work The Last Bar-B-Que, a vividly colored transformation of the Last Supper, following a three-year period during which she examined portrayals by artists from Pietro Lorenzetti to Emil Nolde. The Last Bar-B-Que is considered one of American visual culture's iconic images.

She has also published a children's book, The River that gave gifts (1987).

Exhibitions
Humphrey's first solo exhibition occurred in 1965. Since then, Humphrey's works have been exhibited internationally, and are held in major institutions including the Museum of Modern Art in New York, The Smithsonian American Art Museum in Washington, D.C., the Philadelphia Museum of Art,  the Hampton University Museum, the Victoria and Albert Museum in London, the Museum of Modern Art, Rio de Janeiro, and the National Gallery of Modern Art, Lagos.  In 1996, she was invited to be part of the World Printmaking Survey at the Museum of Modern Art, New York City, NY.

Her Story: Margo Humphrey Lithographs and Works on Paper (2011) at the Hampton University Museum, is a 45-year retrospective of her work, curated by  Robert E. Steele and Adrienne L. Childs.

Awards and honors
Humphrey has received many awards and honors including: 
 The James D. Pheland Award from the World Print Council
 National Endowment of the Arts Fellowships, 1988
 Ford Foundation Fellowship, 1981
 Tiffany Fellowships, 1988
 Teaching Fellowships from the United States Information Agency Arts America Program

References

Further reading

 

1942 births
African-American women artists
Artists from Oakland, California
Living people
American women printmakers
20th-century American women artists
20th-century American printmakers
21st-century American women artists
African-American printmakers
20th-century African-American women
20th-century African-American artists
21st-century African-American women
21st-century African-American artists